Charles Richard Morris  (14 December 1926 – 8 January 2012) was a British politician who served as Member of Parliament (MP) for Manchester Openshaw from 1963 to 1983. A member of the Labour Party, he served as a Minister of State from 1974 to 1979 and a Government Whip from 1966 to 1970.

Early life and career
Charles Richard Morris was born in Ancoats, Manchester on 14 December 1926 to George Morris and Jessie Murphy. His father, who was significantly disabled as result of his World War I injuries, worked as a sign writer; He died at 44, when Charles was nine years-old.

Morris lived in poverty alongside seven other siblings, all of whom faced a workhouse when their home was marked for slum clearance in 1935. Too poor to secure a council house, a local cleric helped them move to a nearby housing project in Newton Heath.

Morris was educated at Brookdale Park School, Manchester. He served with the Royal Engineers in the British Army from 1945 to 1948 before joining the Post Office. Morris was member of the National Executive Council of the Union of Post Office Workers from 1959 to 1963. He joined the Labour Party in 1943 and served on Manchester City Council from 1954 to 1964.

Parliamentary career
Morris first stood for Parliament at the 1959 general election in Cheadle without success. He was elected to represent Manchester Openshaw in Parliament at a by-election in December 1963, caused following the death of incumbent MP William Williams.

He was appointed Parliamentary Private Secretary (PPS) to Tony Benn, then Postmaster General, after Labour's victory at the 1964 general election. He became an Assistant Whip in 1966 and was promoted to Vice-Chamberlain of the Household the following year. Morris served as Deputy Chief Whip and Treasurer of the Household from 1969 until Labour's election defeat in 1970.

Morris was PPS to Harold Wilson during his tenure as Leader of the Opposition from 1970 to 1974. He briefly served as Urban Affairs Minister in the Environment Department after Labour returned to government in 1974, and as Minister for the Civil Service Department from 1974 to 1979. Morris was appointed to the Privy Council in 1977.

His final front bench role was as Shadow Deputy Leader of the House of Commons from 1979 to 1983. He retired from Parliament after his constituency was abolished at the 1983 general election, as he was unable to secure candidacy in another constituency. Morris helped run the unsuccessful Labour campaign at the 1983 general election. After leaving Parliament, he returned to work at his former trade union.

Personal life
His brother, Alf, served as Labour MP for Manchester Wythenshawe from 1964 until 1997, when he was appointed to the House of Lords. Alf introduced the first piece of disability rights legislation in history in 1970, and served as the first ever minister for disabled people from 1974 to 1979.

Morris married Pauline Dunn in 1950, with whom he had daughters Estelle and Heather. Estelle served as Labour MP for Birmingham Yardley from 1992 until 2005, when she was also appointed to the House of Lords. She was Education and Skills Secretary from 2001 to 2002, and a Minister of State between 1997 and 2005.

He died from cancer on 8 January 2012 in Manchester.

See also
List of members of the United Kingdom House of Commons who died in 2012

References

External links 
 Profile at Parliament of the United Kingdom
 Obituary at The Guardian
 Obituary at The Independent
 Obituary at The Times
 

1926 births
2012 deaths
Councillors in Manchester
English trade unionists
Labour Party (UK) MPs for English constituencies
Members of the Privy Council of the United Kingdom
Ministers in the Wilson governments, 1964–1970
Politicians from Manchester
Treasurers of the Household
UK MPs 1959–1964
UK MPs 1964–1966
UK MPs 1966–1970
UK MPs 1970–1974
UK MPs 1974
UK MPs 1974–1979
UK MPs 1979–1983
Union of Communication Workers-sponsored MPs